English Tangier was the period in Moroccan history in which the city of Tangier was occupied by England as part of its colonial empire from 1661 to 1684. Tangier had been under Portuguese control before Charles II of England acquired the city as part of the dowry when he married the Portuguese infanta Catherine. The marriage treaty was an extensive renewal of the Anglo-Portuguese Alliance. It was opposed by Spain, then at war with Portugal, but clandestinely supported by France.

The English garrisoned and fortified the city against hostile but disunited Moroccan forces. The enclave was expensive to defend and fortify and offered neither commercial nor military advantage to England. When Morocco was later united under the Alaouites, the cost of maintaining the garrison against Moroccan attack greatly increased, and Parliamentary refusal to provide funds for its upkeep partly because of fears of 'Popery' and a Catholic succession under James II, forced Charles to give up possession. In 1684, the English blew up the city's harbour and defensive works that they had been constructing and evacuated the city, which was swiftly occupied and annexed by Moroccan forces.

History

Background
Tangier has the best natural harbour on the western end of the Strait of Gibraltar, allowing its owner to control naval access to the Mediterranean. Since antiquity, it and Ceuta to its east were the major commercial centres on the north-western coast of Africa.

Portugal
The Portuguese started their colonial empire by taking nearby Ceuta in 1415. Years of conflict between Portugal and the Moroccans under the Wattasid and Saadi dynasties followed. In 1471, the Portuguese stormed Asilah to the west and threw Tangier into such chaos that they were able to occupy it completely unopposed.

By 1657, the position had changed. The Saadi dynasty steadily lost control of the country to various warlords and finally came to an end with the death of Ahmad al-Abbas. The main warlord around Tangier was Khadir Ghaïlan (known to the English of the time as "Guyland"). He and his family had taken control of much of the Gharb, the Rif, and the other coastal areas around Tangier. He appears to have considerably increased attacks on Portuguese Tangier.

Meanwhile, after the Dila'i interlude, the Alaouites came to the forefront. Mulai al-Rashid (known as "Tafileta" by the English) took Fes in 1666 and Marrakesh in 1669, essentially unifying all of Morocco except the ports occupied by Portugal, Spain, and England. He was supportive of restoring Muslim control over the ports, but he and the last of the Dila'ites (around Salé) still put their own pressures upon Ghaïlan.

The Treaty of the Pyrenees in November 1659 specifically pledged that Louis XIV of France would withdraw support from Portugal under the Braganzas and released Spanish troops and ships to pursue the continuing Portuguese Restoration War. Portugal, severely weakened and with little support in other countries, sought a renewal of its alliance with England to counterbalance the renewed Spanish threat to its independence.

The alliancewhich had originated in 1373had been adjusted and renewed in 1654 under Cromwelland was again renewed in 1660 after the English Restoration. Negotiations for the marriage of Charles to Catherine of Braganza (originally proposed by CharlesI) had started shortly after (perhaps even before) the Restoration, and the proposed marriage was mentioned by the Venetian envoys as early as June 1660. As part of the dowry, Portugal was to hand over the port of Tangier and the island of Bombay (now Mumbai) but it is unclear when those detailed terms were agreed upon or became publicly known. Some were widely rumoured early, certainly before the marriage treaty itself.

The Portuguese government was content to part with Tangier, though many within the country had reservations. The anchorage was not particularly safe for shipping and, exposed to the Atlantic and to destructive winds from the east, it was expensive to maintain, requiring significant improvement. Khadir Ghaïlan had mounted a major attack on the city in 1657, forcing the governor and garrison to appeal to Lisbon for assistance. Portugal, hard pressed in its war of independence from Spain and struggling against Dutch aggression in the East Indies, could not hope to maintain all of its overseas possessions without English assistance and could not afford to commit troops to the defence of Tangier while fighting Spain in the Iberian peninsula. Indeed, Portugal had even offered Tangier to France in 1648 to try to solicit support against Spain.

However, cession of Tangier to England was not popular with the general public and with many in the army. The governor of Tangier, Fernando de Meneses, refused to co-operate and had to be replaced in 1661 by the more compliant Luis de Almeida.

Spain
Spain had tolerated Portuguese occupation of Tangier as part of the Treaty of Tordesillas and had left its Portuguese administration largely undisturbed during the Iberian Union and even under the long-running Restoration War, lest a weakened position expose it to Moroccan reconquest. Nonetheless, Spain was strongly opposed to English possession of Tangier and insisted that the cession would be illegal. Indeed, the note presented by the Spanish ambassador in May 1661 openly threatened war.

A strongly established English naval presence at the Straits of Gibraltar posed a threat to its ports on both the Atlantic and Mediterranean and to communication between them. It also threatened communication not just with Spain's colonial empire but with the maritime links between Spain and the Habsburg's Italian possessions in Sicily and Naples. English fleet activities in the Mediterranean under Robert Blake and Edward Montagu between 1650 and 1659 had shown just how vulnerable Spain's shipping lanes had become. With its emphasis on its transatlantic possessions, Spain had no Mediterranean fleet and could not protect its shipping there: the presence of a hostile naval force at Tangier would make the transfer of Spanish troops from Italy to Spain for the intended war against Portugal much more difficult.

By a proclamation of 7 September 1660 (announced in Spain on 22 September), Charles had declared peace with Spain, but in the same month the Commons passed a bill annexing Dunkirk and Jamaica. Both had been taken under Cromwell and both had been demanded back by Spain upon the ascension of CharlesII. There was a fear in England that the Portuguese commander at Tangier would hand the port over to Spain rather than "heretic" England or that Spain would otherwise attempt physically to prevent the handover, even if its actions fell short of war. There were further fears that Spain had enlisted Ghaïlan's assistance to attack by land while Spain attacked by sea.

Dutch Republic
The Dutch had suffered intensely during the First Anglo-Dutch War. Although they were at peace for the moment, they were still competing intensely for trade and had no wish to see the English navy further establish the Mediterranean power it had developed under Cromwell. They were at war with the Portuguese and did not want to see the Anglo-Portuguese alliance renewed. The Dutch hoped to seize more of Portugal's overseas possessions and had equipped a fleet for that purpose in 1660. They tried, unsuccessfully, to strengthen relations with KingCharlesII by the Dutch Gift in July of the same year.

The States General also sought in negotiations from July 1660 until September 1662 to secure a treaty or pact of friendship with England, but refused to extend such a treaty to any colonies outside Europe with the sole exception of the island of Pulo Run. While that negotiation went on, Charles offered to mediate between the United Provinces and Portugal. (The Anglo-Portuguese treaty, a very short time later, required this.) His intervention resulted in the Treaty of The Hague on 6 August 1661, although it was ignored by the Dutch East India Company. The Company seized Cranganore, Cochin, Nagapattinam, and Cannanore from Portugal in 1662 and 1663.

At the same time, King Charles sought the advancement of his nephew William (later WilliamIII) as Stadtholder. Johan De Witt, the "Grand Pensionary", was a confirmed Republican and had excluded William through the 'secret' (but widely leaked) Act of Seclusion annex to the Treaty of Westminster with Cromwell. The States General was unable or unwilling to rein in the Dutch East India Company's aggressively anti-English and anti-Portuguese activities; the Republic hence had no significant influence in Restoration England, and De Witt's diplomatic failures in 1660-1661 marked the beginning of the end of the Dutch Golden Age. Although De Ruyter's presence in the Mediterranean necessitated caution, the English acquisition of Tangier could not be meaningfully opposed by the Dutch.

France
In France, Cardinal Mazarin was at the height of his powers following the formation of the League of the Rhine in 1658; the defeatwith the help of Cromwell's army and navyof the Prince of Condé and Spain at the Battle of the Dunes the same year; and the signing of the Treaty of the Pyrenees on 7 November 1659. Spain (then allied with English Royalists) and France (allied with Commonwealth England) made peace, and by the treaty LouisXIV was betrothed to Maria Theresa of Spain. The treaty also required France to cease direct or indirect support for Portugal. In May 1660, six months after the treaty was signed, CharlesII was restored. Mazarin realized that an alliance between Restoration England and Spain, with its extensive lands in Italy and the Netherlands, would almost surround France and leave both more powerful than he wished; he worked quickly to restore relations with Charles's court. By August, he had proposed the marriage of Philippe I, Duke of Orléans, to Charles's sister Henrietta Anne. It is likely that he encouraged the Braganza marriage, but he died on 9 March 1661 and Louis took personal control of his government. In July 1661, Louis sent the Comte d'Estrades as his ambassador to London, and it is clear from the instructions and correspondence between them that the treaty between England and Portugal was welcomed by France. At the time, France had no significant Mediterranean or East Indies naval presence, and English possession of Tangier and Bombay posed no apparent threat. In 1656, Louis or Mazarin had proposed the cession of Tangier to France, but no agreement had been reached and the peace with Spain probably precluded any further similar proposal.

England
In 1659, Cromwell's England was allied to France by the Treaty of Paris, was allied to Portugal, was at war with Spain, and was not a party to the Treaty of the Pyrenees. King Charles II's government in exile was, technically, allied to Spain and so pledged to resist Portugal's independence and to raise forces against France by the Treaty of Brussels, the converse of the Commonwealth position. After his restoration, Charles declared peace with Spain in September 1660 but there was already speculation about a possible Portuguese marriage. There is debate as to who proposed Charles's marriage to Catherine of Braganza and when; but by a letter dated 5 or 15 June 1660, the queen regent of Portugal Luisa de Guzmán requested Charles's consent to send Francisco de Mello as an ambassador extraordinary to negotiate a new treaty. According to Clarendon's account, the ambassador suggested the treaty and marriage to the lord chamberlain the Earl of Manchester, who informed the King. Charles consulted Clarendon (Lord Chancellor), Southampton (Lord Treasurer), Ormonde (Lord Steward of the Household), Lord Manchester, and Sir Edward Nicholas (Secretary of State) and enquired as to Tangier of Admirals Lord Sandwich and Sir John Lawson. Clarendon is vague, perhaps misleading, as to chronology. Ambassador De Mello had a private audience with Charles on 28 July 1660 (7 August 1660 NS) and, after other meetings, returned to Lisbon on 18 or 28 October 1660. The Queen Regent was pleased and made him Marquis de Sande' He returned to England on 9 February 1661 (NS) and from then until announcement of the marriage at the opening of the Cavalier Parliament on 8 or 18 May 1661 there were rumours and counter-rumours, amongst them suggested marriages to Mademoiselle d'Orleans (who had previously rejected Charles), to an unidentified 'Princess of Parma', and to Princess Maria of Nassau. Indeed, rumours continued even after that, but the treaty was signed on 23 June 1661 and witnessed by Clarendon, Southampton, Albemarle, Ormonde, Manchester, Nicholas, and Morrice.

English occupation

Sandwich and Portugal 1661/1662
Before the treaty with Portugal and marriage to Catherine was announced at Charles's coronation on 8 May 1661, Admiral Sir Edward Montagu, 1st Earl of Sandwich was commissioned to bring Catherine over to England. The corsair fleet of Algiers was a growing problem. Montagu was instructed, by negotiation or by bombardment, to secure a treaty with Algiers not to molest English ships. He also carried instructions to seek peaceful arrangements with Tripoli, Tetuan, and Salé. Sandwich left London on 13 June for the fleet assembled at the Downs and from there, with John Lawson as Vice-Admiral, sailed to Algiers, where he arrived on 29 July. There was little negotiation, and a short bombardment, but weather prevented more significant action. Sandwich left Lawson to blockade Algiers, and proceeded to Lisbon, not yet in his official capacity as an Ambassador Extraordinaire, but rather to meet a second English fleet which was to take possession of Tangier. There was a perceived danger that the Spanish and Dutch would attack the Portuguese Brazil fleet and, reciprocally, Spain and the allied Dutch merchants feared that the English would attack the Spanish treasure fleet; hence there was some careful watching until those both arrived safely. The marriage, by proxy, of Charles and Catherine was notified to the Governor of Tangier (Don Luis D'Almeida) by letter from the King of Portugal on 4 September 1661. Lord Sandwich sailed back to Tangier on 3 October (arriving 10 October) taking transports for the evacuation of the Portuguese Tangier Garrison. He remained there for some three months, while awaiting the further fleet from England bringing the new Governor and troops. Still expecting trouble from Spain or the Netherlands, Lawson's squadron joined him, unsuccessful in subduing Algiers (although a storm severely damaged the harbour there the next year and enabled a peace later). During the waiting time, there was correspondence with the other Barbary ports, and with Ghaïlan, who ostensibly welcomed Sandwich. Sandwich had met Ghaïlan before, when watering the fleet during his 1657 voyage with Robert Blake in the Mediterranean. It is likely that Sandwich also used the time to obtain details of the city and its defences – Martin Beckman was with Sandwich's fleet at Algiers and Tangier and produced the map later seen and admired by Pepys. It was reported that Sir John Lawson and Sir Richard Stayner purchased houses in the town during this time and, perhaps, Sandwich also bought then the house he later owned.

In England, a Tangier Committee of the King's Privy Council was appointed, with its members including Samuel Pepys, Secretary to the Admiralty, and Prince Rupert of the Rhine. Pepys later claimed that all Rupert did in meetings was to laugh and swear occasionally.

On 14 January 1662, the Portuguese garrison attempted a sally out into the surrounding countryside, taking about 400 head of cattle, and also capturing 35 women and girls. Unsurprisingly, the Moroccans counter-attacked and recovered the booty, killing some 51 of the Portuguese, including the Aidill (the military commander) and twelve knights, pursuing the remainder of the force to the city gates. Alarmed, the Governor (Luis de Almeida) requested assistance from Sandwich's fleet in the bay. Sandwich sent parties of seamen ashore to man the defences, under the command of Sir Richard Stayner, effectively (but not formally) taking control of the city to help protect it against attacks by Ghaïlan (supported by Spain) and, perhaps, to ensure a withdrawal by the Portuguese. By 23 January, Sandwich had three to four hundred men ashore.

Peterborough, Teviot, Bridge, FitzGerald, Belasyse and Ghaïlan 1662/1666

On 6 September 1661, King Charles had appointed Henry Mordaunt, 2nd Earl of Peterborough, as governor and captain general of all the forces in Tangier. Peterborough quite quickly raised a regiment in England, probably in large part from the Parliamentary forces which were being disbanded, but otherwise took some time over the preparations; he finally sailed for Tangier on 15 January 1662, arriving, with a considerable force, on 29 January. When Peterborough landed he found the fleet already in possession. The Tangier Garrison (his new regiment augmented by units from Flanders) disembarked on 30 January and the city keys were handed over with due ceremony.

The start was far from auspicious. The available accommodation was completely insufficient for the three thousand or so troops, who had little in common (neither language nor, for the most part, religion or custom) with the Portuguese population; the money (such as was available to the new occupants) was English currency, unfamiliar to the townspeople. The basis of the Portuguese garrison had, in large part, been a militia of the men of the town and they, of course, had been driven back within the walls. Given that Portugal had been seeking (and, latterly, expecting) to dispose of Tangier; had a major war with Spain at home; and needed to raise a very significant dowry for the marriage; it is not surprising that some neglect may have crept in but it is also clear that Peterborough was not well prepared. The list of the stores which were immediately required, even after Sandwich had provided much from the fleet, is a tacit admission of the inadequacy of those brought with the occupation force. Peterborough reported that the Portuguese, leaving, had carried off the very ffloers, the Windowes, and the Dores, but since most of the inhabitants, and their possessions, were repatriated by the English fleet, that may be an exaggeration.

Moreover, the idea that the Portuguese inhabitants would enrol as soldiers for the new Government is nowhere reflected in the forecast expenditure of the garrison, except in respect of a troop of horse which did, in fact, enrol.

At the time when Peterborough arrived, Ghaïlan was engaged at Salé, fighting with Mohammed al-Hajj ibn Abu Bakr al-Dila'i (known to the English as "Ben Bowker") the last (as it turned out) of the Dila'ites but, with his army, he appeared close to Tangier around 22 March 1662, and Peterborough arranged parleys.

Perhaps indicative of the problem with borders or limits to English possession of the city is the map of the forts around Tangier in 1680. To the East, beyond York Fort, and beyond the ominous, all-embracing, area marked as "The Moors", are the words "To Portugal Cross". It is perfectly likely that this refers to a form of padrão marking what the Portuguese considered to be the border. English occupation never came close to establishing such a distant frontier.

These units were augmented later in 1662 by elements of Rutherfurd's (Scottish Royalist) Regiment and Roger Alsop's (Parliamentarian) Regiment just before Peterborough was replaced by Andrew Rutherfurd, 1st Earl of Teviot as Governor. The regiments were merged (into two in 1662) ultimately becoming a single regiment (1668), and this, the Tangier Regiment, remained in Tangier thereafter, a total of 23 years, until the port was finally evacuated in 1684.

Each redoubt had four hundred men guarding the excavation site, while to the front balls of spikes, stakes and piles of gunpowder-and-stone mix, which acted as basic landmines, were laid.

Norwood, Middleton and Inchiquin 1666/1680
In 1674, William O'Brien, 2nd Earl of Inchiquin took up the post of governor, in succession to the Earl of Middleton. In 1675, a garrison school was founded, led by the Rev. Dr George Mercer.

On 30 December 1676, Charles ordered a survey of the city and garrison of Tangier, which was costing about £140,000 a year to maintain. The survey showed that the total inhabitants numbered 2,225, of whom fifty were army officers, 1,231 other ranks, with 302 army wives and children. Amongst the buildings was a hospital and an army school.

On 4 June 1668, Tangier was declared a free city by charter, with a mayor and corporation to govern it instead of the army. The charter made it equal to English towns.

Ossory, Plymouth, Sackville, Kirke and Mulai al-Rashid 1680/1683

In 1680, the pressure from the Moroccans increased, as the Moroccan Sultan Moulay Ismail joined forces with the Chief of Fez in order to pursue a war against all foreign troops in his land. Reinforcements were needed at the Garrison, which was raised to 3,000 in number. The Royal Scots, shortly followed by a further (new) foot regiment, the 2nd Tangier Regiment, (later the King's Own, 4th Regiment of Foot) raised on 13 July 1680, were sent to Tangier, reinforced by a composite King's Battalion formed from the Grenadier and Coldstream Guards, the Duke of York's Regiment (disbanded in 1690) and The Holland Regiment (the later 3rd Foot) and the remnant of the old Tangier Regiment. The King's Battalion landed in July 1680, and fierce attacks were made against the Moors, who had gained a footing on the edge of the town, finally defeating them by controlled and well-aimed musket fire. The Battalion remained in Tangier until the fort was abandoned.

In 1680 the Earl of Inchiquin resigned and was replaced by Thomas Butler, 6th Earl of Ossory, who died before taking up his post.

In October 1680, Colonel Charles FitzCharles, 1st Earl of Plymouth, arrived as governor, but was taken mortally ill soon afterwards. Lt-Colonel Edward Sackville of the Coldstream Guards took over the governorship temporarily until on 28 December 1680 Colonel Piercy Kirke was appointed colonel and governor.

The garrison at Tangier had to be constantly reinforced, having cost nearly two million pounds of royal treasure, and many lives had been sacrificed in its defence. Merchant ships continued to be harassed by Barbary pirates, and undefended crews were regularly captured into slavery. The so-called Popish Plot in England had intensified the dread of Catholicism, and the King's frequent request for more troops to increase the size of the garrison raised suspicions that a standing army was being retained in Tangier to ensure a Catholic succession and absolute monarchy.

In England, in the Exclusion Crisis, the House of Commons of England petitioned the King to give his assent to the Bill of Exclusion (which had passed the Commons, but not the Lords) intended to disinherit the Duke of York (later James II & VII). The Earl of Shaftesbury (effectively the Prime Minister) urged Parliament to disapprove any taxes unless and until the bill was passed. The King refused to prejudice his brother's right of succession and dismissed the Exclusion Bill Parliament and, later, the Oxford Parliament. But he could no longer afford the cost of the colony in Tangier.

Dartmouth and evacuation 1683/1684
For some time Parliament had been concerned about the cost of maintaining the Tangier garrison. By 1680 the King had threatened to give up Tangier unless the supplies were voted for its sea defences, intended to provide a safe harbour for shipping. The fundamental problem was that in order to keep the town and harbour free from cannon fire the perimeter of the defended area had to be vastly increased. A number of outworks were built but the siege of 1680 showed that the Moroccans were capable of isolating and capturing these outworks by entrenchments and mining.
Although the attempt by Sultan Moulay Ismail of Morocco to seize the town had been unsuccessful, a crippling blockade by the Jaysh al-Rifi ultimately forced the English to withdraw. In 1683, Charles gave Admiral Lord Dartmouth secret orders to abandon Tangier. Dartmouth was to level the fortifications, destroy the harbour, and evacuate the troops. In August 1683 Dartmouth, as Admiral of the Fleet and governor and captain general in Tangier, sailed from Plymouth. He was accompanied by Samuel Pepys, who wrote an account of the evacuation.

Once in Tangier, one of Lord Dartmouth's main concerns was the evacuation of sick soldiers "and the many families and their effects to be brought off". The hospital ship Unity sailed for England on 18 October 1683 with 114 invalid soldiers and 104 women and children, alongside HMS Diamond. HMS Diamond arrived at The Downs on 14 December 1683. Dartmouth was also able to purchase the release of many English prisoners from Ismail's bagnio, including several officers and about 40 men, some of whom had spent 10 years in the hands of the Moroccans.

All the forts and walls were mined for last-minute destruction. On 5 February 1684 Tangier was officially evacuated, leaving the town in ruins. Thereafter Kirke's Regiment (i.e., the Tangier Regiment) returned to England. The main force of 2,830 officers and men and 361 wives and children finally completed the demolition of the harbour wall and fortifications, and evacuated the garrison during the early months of 1684. The 2nd Tangier Regiment left late in the second week of February for Plymouth with some six hundred men and thirty wives and children. The Earl of Dumbarton's regiment (The Royal Scots) went into quarters at Rochester, and Trelawney's (Second Tangier) Regiment to Portsmouth.

Aftermath
Some of the departing soldiers were to be rewarded with large land grants in the newly acquired Province of New York. Thomas Dongan, 2nd Earl of Limerick, a lieutenant-governor of Tangier, became New York provincial governor and William "Tangier" Smith, the last mayor of Tangier, obtained 50 miles of Atlantic oceanfront property on Long Island.

The mole
Work began on the fortified harbour at the end of November, 1662, and work on the Mole in August, 1663. The work continued for some years under a succession of governors. With an improved harbour the town would have played the same role that Gibraltar later played in British naval strategy.

Governors

See also
 List of governors of Tangier
 George Elliott, surgeon
 Roger Elliott
 Alexander Spotswood
 Tangier Protocol
 Tangier Garrison

Notes

References

Citations

Bibliography
 
 
 
 
  as reproduced at 
 
 
 .
 
 
 
 
 Venetian Papers
  URL is preview location only.
 
 . URL is preview location only. 
 . URL is preview location only.

 
History of Tangier
Tangier
Former colonies in Africa
Tangier
17th century in Morocco
1661 establishments in Africa
1684 disestablishments in Africa
1661 establishments in the British Empire
1684 disestablishments in the British Empire
1660s in the British Empire
1670s in the British Empire
1680s in the British Empire
Charles II of England
Catherine of Braganza